Douglas County Courthouse is a historic courthouse at 6754 West Broad Street in Douglasville, Georgia, United States.

The courthouse was built in 1956, after the 1896 courthouse burned down. It was built where three prior courthouses originally stood. It was designed in the International Style by Harry E. Roos, Jr. of Southern Engineering.

In 1998, after the opening of the new courthouse, it was set for demolition. However, the local Tourism and History Commission was able to convince the county government to keep it. It became the Douglas County Museum of History and Art. On October 24, 2002, it was added to the U.S. National Register of Historic Places.

Douglas County Museum of History and Art
Established in 1999, the Douglas County Museum of History and Art features rotating exhibits of mid-20th century history, reflecting the courthouse's era, and exhibits of local history.  Themes include Native Americans, pioneer life, the American Civil War, the history of Douglasville, area veterans, black education, farm life and early medicine. The museum's special collections of American pop culture include lunchboxes, record players, Coca-Cola items and television lamps.

References

External links
 Douglas County Museum of History and Art

Buildings and structures in Douglas County, Georgia
Courthouses on the National Register of Historic Places in Georgia (U.S. state)
Former county courthouses in Georgia (U.S. state)
Government buildings completed in 1956
National Register of Historic Places in Douglas County, Georgia